TVpad was a series of set-top box devices that connected television to various Asian channels. It used a broadband connection and used a version of Android as the operating system. TVpad's main market was Chinese consumers worldwide. The label on an M358 device identifies the manufacturer as Create New Technology (HK) Limited.

TVpad ended service in 2017, following a lawsuit from various television broadcasters.

Versions

There were four generations of TVpads:

TVpad:  M121S, M121 and M120
TVpad 2: M233
TVpad 3: M358
TVpad 4: M418

There were two editions of M418: CN and GCN. CN edition was tailored for mandarin-speaking overseas Chinese.

Hardware Specifications

TVPad2:  M233
 CPU:  	TCC892x (ARM Cortex-A5) processor
 ARM instruction set:   ARMv7 
 Chipset 	TCC8920 ???
 RAM 	377MB
 ROM 	4G onboard eMMC NAND storage
 Extended memory 	Supports external 8GB microSD
 Output port 	HDMI / AV
 Power 	DC 5V, P<5W, P(Standby)<0.5W
 USB port 	USB2.0
 Firmware 	3.94

TVpad3: M358
 CPU 	TCC8925 Single Core
 RAM 	512MB
 ROM 	4GB
 Extended memory 	Supports external 8GB TF-card
 Output port 	HDMI / AV
 Power 	DC 5V, P<5W, P(Standby)<0.5W
 USB port 	USB2.0
 Firmware 	M358
 Internet 	Ethernet port and Built-in WiFi
 Required Internet 	2MB/S
 Operating System 	Android 3.70
 Max video resolution 	Up to 1920 x 1080 pixels at 60 Hz
 Picture formats 	JPEG, PNG
 Video encoding 	MPEG-1/2/4, H.264, WMV7/8/9, DivX, Xvid, RV10/20/30/40 etc.
 Video formats 	AVI, VOB, WMV, H.264, RMVB suffixes and more
 Size 	104 x 104 x 28mm

Lawsuit

On March 13, 2015, Chinese broadcaster CCTV, Hong Kong broadcaster TVB, and American television provider Dish Network filed a complaint in the United States District Court of California alleging: Direct Copyright Infringement, Secondary Copyright Infringement, Trademark Infringement, Unfair Competition, and Violation of Business and Professions Code 17200.

TVPad4 stopped streaming on July 15, 2017.

References

External links
 TVPad VAR Home Page (redirected to Go Daddy)
 TVPad Shut Down by Lawsuit

Television technology